Minister of Culture and media is the person in charge of the Ministry of Culture and Media of Montenegro. In 2020, Ministry merged into the Ministry of Education, Science, Culture and Sports. It was once again re-established in 2022, under the name of Ministry of Culture and Media

Ministers of Culture, 2006-2020

References

Government ministries of Montenegro
Culture ministries
Ministries established in 2006
2006 establishments in Montenegro